Barlow Hall is an ancient manor house and Grade II listed building in Chorlton-cum-Hardy in the suburbs of Manchester, England. A house has existed on the site since at least the 13th century, but the present building dates back no further than the 16th century (rebuilt in 1584), with later additions. The house was for a long time the property of the Barlow family, whose estates were sold to the Egertons in 1785. It was the birthplace of Ambrose Barlow, a Roman Catholic priest martyred at Lancaster Castle.The ownership of Barlow Hall remains with Barlow Hall Manor Limited, Members of Chorlton cum Hardy Golf Club are shareholders and the Hall cannot be sold without total approval of members. Dated 5/5/2021. D. Boyle, Director.

References

Houses in Manchester
Grade II listed buildings in Manchester
Country houses in Greater Manchester